183rd Brigade may refer to:

 183rd Mixed Brigade (Spain)
 183rd (2nd Gloucester and Worcester) Brigade (United Kingdom)